Herod's Palace is an archaeological site within the fortress of Herodium in the West Bank, about 12 kilometers south of Jerusalem. Herod the Great commissioned a lavish palace to be built between 23 and 15 BCE atop Herodium for all to see. The palace itself consisted of four towers of seven stories, a bathhouse, courtyards, a Roman theatre, banquet rooms, a large walkway (“the course”), as well as extravagant living quarters for himself and guests. Once Herod died and the Great Revolt started, Herodium was abandoned. The Jews eventually had a base at Herodium where they built a synagogue which can still be seen today, unlike much of Herod's Palace.

Construction

Archaeologists believe that the palace was built by slaves, paid workers (contractors), and architects. Herod was considered one of the greatest builders of his time, and geography did not daunt him—his palace was built on the edge of the desert and was situated atop an artificial hill. The largest of the four towers was built on a stone base 18 meters in diameter. This was most likely where Herod lived; he decorated his rooms with mosaic floors and elaborate frescoes. The other three towers, which consisted of living spaces and storage, were 16 meters in diameter. Outside, several cisterns were built to collect water that was channeled into the palace.

Excavation
The archaeological excavation of Herodium was begun in 1962 by Virgilio Canio Corbo and Stanislao Loffreda, from the Studium Biblicum Franciscanum of Jerusalem, and it continued until 1967: they discovered the upper citadel, at the top of the hill.

From 1972, excavations were carried out by Ehud Netzer, working on behalf of the Hebrew University of Jerusalem, and they were intermittent until the archaeologist's death in 2010. Netzer excavated mostly the lower palace, at the base of the hill. 

Many archaeologists suspect that mosaic floors and frescoes were common throughout the palace, but it will take more work to reveal them because of the thousands of years that have passed since its construction.

Excavated areas

	Bathhouse

The Roman bathhouse consisted of three areas, the caldarium, the tepidarium, and the frigidarium. It also had a very impressive dome which is still in good condition today despite thousands of years of earthquakes and wars.  The caldarium had vaulted ceilings, raised floors, and channels in the walls to conduct heat. The tepidarium had mosaic floors and frescoes just like the living quarters of the palace.  The frigidarium, the last stop in the bathhouse, was where guests would cool off in a large pool.

	Roman Theatre

Netzer discovered the Roman Theatre just before his death in late 2010. A loggia, or a theatre box, was discovered. This means that when Herod or other notable officials went to see a play, they would receive luxury treatment. The rest of the audience would be seated below on benches that could accommodate about 650 people. What is quite unique about this find is that frescoes of landscapes were discovered. This suggests that the painters were well traveled; they depict scenes of Italy and even the Nile River in Egypt. It is also assumed that the painters were on loan to Herod from Caesar in Rome.

See also
Herodium
Herodian architecture

References

Palaces in the State of Palestine
Herod the Great